Porskokova is a rural locality (a village) in Yorgvinskoye Rural Settlement, Kudymkarsky District, Perm Krai, Russia. The population was 126 as of 2010. There are 11 streets.

Geography 
Porskokova is located 11 km northeast of Kudymkar (the district's administrative centre) by road. Chashchilova is the nearest rural locality.

References 

Rural localities in Kudymkarsky District